William Thomas Parry (May 17, 1837September 10, 1896) was a Welsh American immigrant, businessman, Republican politician, and Wisconsin pioneer.  He was a member of the Wisconsin State Senate and Assembly, representing Columbia County.

Biography
William T. Parry was born in Bangor, Gwynedd, in Wales, and received his basic education there.  He emigrated to the United States as a child in 1849, and settled in the town of Manchester, Wisconsin, which was then part of Marquette County.  He lived there until adulthood.  He moved to Berlin, Wisconsin, in 1858, and then moved to Portage, in Columbia County, Wisconsin, in 1859.

At Portage, he clerked for the business of A. D. Forbes for six years until starting his own merchant business partnership, known as Parry, Bebb, & Muir (later Parry & Muir).  He continued running that business until his retirement in 1892.

He was elected to the Wisconsin State Assembly on the Republican Party ticket in 1880 and was re-elected in 1881.  In 1882, he was elected to a four-year term in the Wisconsin State Senate.  During his time in the Legislature, he was active in supporting temperance legislation.

In 1889, he was appointed to the State Board of Supervision by Governor William D. Hoard, and served on the board until it was disbanded in 1891.  The board oversaw the state's mental hospitals, schools for state orphans and for the blind and deaf, and the state prisons.  It was replaced by the State Board of Charities and Reform.

He moved to Milwaukee in 1892.  He died there on September 10, 1896, after a long and painful battle with throat cancer.

Personal life and family
William Parry married twice.  His first wife was Margaret Williams, they married at Randolph, Wisconsin, on June 30, 1857.  They had two children together before her death in 1866.  The following year, Parry married Annie Roberts—who was also a Welsh immigrant—at Utica, New York.  They had four more children.  Parry was survived by his second wife and all six children.

References

External links
 

1837 births
1896 deaths
People from Bangor, Gwynedd
Welsh emigrants to the United States
People from Green Lake County, Wisconsin
People from Portage, Wisconsin
Republican Party members of the Wisconsin State Assembly
Republican Party Wisconsin state senators
19th-century American politicians